Lièvremont is a French surname. Notable people with the surname include:

Marc Lièvremont (born 1968), French rugby union player
Matthieu Lièvremont (born 1975), French rugby union player
Thomas Lièvremont (born 1973), French rugby union player

See also
Maisons-du-Bois-Lièvremont, French commune

French-language surnames